The Singapore and West Malaysia Diocesan Association was founded in 1911 to assist the work of the Church of England in Singapore and West Malaysia.

It ceased operation in 2015.

See also 
 Anglican Diocese of Singapore
Anglican Diocese of Singapore (1909)
 Diocese of Singapore and Malaya. 1960-1970
 Diocese of West Malaysia, founded 1970
Borneo Mission Association
Church of the Province of South East Asia

External links 
Two mission associations close - but Anglican Church in South East Asia marches on

Church of England missions
Church of England missionary societies
Christian organizations established in 1911
Religious organizations disestablished in 2015